The 1995 São Tomé and Príncipe coup d'état attempt was an attempted military coup in São Tomé and Príncipe on August 15, 1995. The coup was launched against the government of President Miguel Trovoada, and was led by Lieutenant Manuel Quintas de Almeida. The immediate cause of the coup was a long, 6-month delay in the soldiers' salary, poor supply and living conditions of the soldiers. However, under pressure from the international community, the military returned power to Trovoada on August 22.

See also
History of São Tomé and Príncipe
2003 São Tomé and Príncipe coup d'état attempt
2022 São Tomé and Príncipe coup d'état attempt

References

São Tomé and Príncipe coup d'état attempt, 1995
São Tomé and Príncipe coup d'état attempt
History of São Tomé and Príncipe
Attempted coups d'état in São Tomé and Príncipe
São Tomé and Príncipe coup d'état attempt
Coup d'état attempt